Andrew Ewing (June 17, 1813 – June 16, 1864) was an American politician and a member of the United States House of Representatives for the 8th congressional district of Tennessee.

Biography
Ewing was born in Nashville on June 17, 1813. After completing preparatory studies, he graduated from the University of Nashville in 1832. He studied law, was admitted to the bar in 1835, and commenced practice in Nashville, Tennessee. He was the chosen trustee of the University of Nashville in 1833, and served in that office until his death.

Career
Elected as a Democrat to the Thirty-first Congress, Ewing served from March 4, 1849, to March 3, 1851.  He declined to be a candidate for renomination in 1850. He resumed the practice of law in Nashville, and he was a delegate to the 1860 Democratic National Convention at Baltimore. During the Civil War, he served as judge of General Braxton Bragg's military court.

Death
Ewing died in Atlanta, Georgia, on June 16, 1864 (age 50 years, 365 days). He is interred at Nashville City Cemetery in Nashville, Tennessee. He was the brother of fellow congressman Edwin Hickman Ewing.

References

External links
 

1813 births
1864 deaths
University of Nashville alumni
Tennessee lawyers
Politicians from Nashville, Tennessee
Democratic Party members of the United States House of Representatives from Tennessee
19th-century American politicians
19th-century American lawyers